37 Aquilae, abbreviated 37 Aql, is a star in the equatorial constellation of Aquila. 37 Aquilae is its Flamsteed designation. It has an apparent visual magnitude of approximately 5.12, which is bright enough to be visible to the naked eye. The star is moving closer to the Earth with a heliocentric radial velocity of −30 km/s, and is predicted to come to within  in around 4.4 million years.

This is an aging giant star with a stellar classification of G8 IIIa. It is uncertain whether this star is on the red giant branch or the horizontal branch; Reffert et al. (2015) give 57% odd that it is the latter. In that case, their model shows an estimated age of 1.2 billion years with 2.3 times the mass of the Sun and 23 times the Sun's radius. It is radiating 219 times the Sun's luminosity from its enlarged photosphere at an effective temperature of 4,594 K. These coordinates are a source of X-ray emission, which is most likely coming from the star.

References

G-type giants
Aquila (constellation)
Aquilae, k
Durchmusterung objects
Aquilae, 37
184492
096327
7430